Alastair Wilson (born 19 December 1983, in Sheffield) is a British field hockey player, he has competed in the European championship, as well as in the World Championship and in the 2008 and 2012 Olympics.

Wilson graduated from Nottingham Trent University in business studies, in 2007. He plays as forward in Field Hockey, and he first played for England in January 2005 on a tour of South Africa, and has since played for England 45 times and for Great Britain over 20 times, including three appearances in the EuroHockey Nations Championship, and a part in the 2006 World Cup as substitute for Ben Marsden.

Wilson played for Great Britain at the Beijing 2008 Olympic Games, where the team came fifth in the tournament, and at the 2012 Summer Olympics, where they came fourth, losing the bronze medal match to Australia.

References

External links
 
 
 

Alumni of Nottingham Trent University
Field hockey players at the 2008 Summer Olympics
Olympic field hockey players of Great Britain
English male field hockey players
Living people
1983 births
Field hockey players at the 2012 Summer Olympics
Loughborough Students field hockey players
Beeston Hockey Club players
2010 Men's Hockey World Cup players